Institute of Archaeology may refer to:

 British Institute of Archaeology (disambiguation)
 Cobb Institute of Archaeology
 Institute of Archaeology, Chinese Academy of Social Sciences (IA CASS)
 Institute of Archaeology (Oxford)
 Institute of Archaeology and Art History, Cluj-Napoca
 Pandit Deendayal Upadhyaya Institute of Archaeology
 Vasile Pârvan Institute of Archaeology
 Vietnam Institute of Archaeology
 UCL Institute of Archaeology